Rovajärvi is the main artillery practice range of the Finnish Army and the largest such range in Europe at . It is located within the municipalities of Rovaniemi and Kemijärvi. A two-week general military exercise for artillery conscripts is arranged biannually in Rovajärvi.

External links 
 

Rovaniemi
Kemijärvi
Military of Finland
Buildings and structures in Lapland (Finland)